Quality and Reliability Engineering International is a scientific journal focusing on engineering quality and reliability.  This includes the quality and reliability of components, equipment, and physics of failure.  It covers the fields of electrical, mechanical, and systems engineering

External links 
 

Engineering journals
Wiley (publisher) academic journals
Publications established in 1985
English-language journals